Zoran Petrović (born August 22, 1960, in Belgrade) is a Serbian former water polo player. As a member of Yugoslavia's water polo team he won a gold medal at the 1984 Summer Olympics.

See also
 Yugoslavia men's Olympic water polo team records and statistics
 List of Olympic champions in men's water polo
 List of Olympic medalists in water polo (men)
 List of world champions in men's water polo
 List of World Aquatics Championships medalists in water polo

References

External links
 

1960 births
Living people
Serbian male water polo players
Yugoslav male water polo players
Olympic medalists in water polo
Olympic gold medalists for Yugoslavia
Olympic water polo players of Yugoslavia
Sportspeople from Belgrade
Water polo players at the 1984 Summer Olympics
Medalists at the 1984 Summer Olympics